This is the family tree of the Princes of Zrin, a Croatian noble family, from 1347 to 1703.

See also 

 House of Zrinski
 House of Šubić
 Šubić family tree
 Frankopan family tree
 List of rulers of Croatia

References

Family trees
Croatian noble families